The Source of the Nile Bridge, also New Jinja Bridge, which was commissioned on 17 October 2018, by the President of Uganda, is a cable-stayed bridge across the Victoria Nile in Uganda. It replaced the Nalubaale Bridge, which was built in 1954.

Location
The bridge is located at Njeru, a suburb of the city of Jinja across the Victoria Nile, between the source of the Nile to the south and Nalubaale Power Station (old bridge) to the north. This is adjacent and immediately north of where the Uganda Railways line crosses the Victoria Nile. The coordinates of the New Jinja Bridge are 0°26'19.0"N, 33°11'15.0"E (Latitude:0.438611; Longitude:33.187500).

History
The road crossing at Jinja is of national and regional significance because it is part of the "Northern Corridor", a highway across east and central Africa linking the Indian Ocean at Mombasa, Kenya, to the Atlantic Ocean at Matadi, Democratic Republic of the Congo. The old bridge, commissioned in 1954, is in bad structural shape and has outlived its expected lifespan. The new bridge carries a four-lane dual highway with pedestrian sidewalks. The feasibility studies were conducted by the Japan International Cooperation Agency.

Construction
In November 2013, the Uganda National Roads Authority awarded the construction contract to the Zenitaka Corporation of Japan and Hyundai Engineering and Construction Company of South Korea. Construction was expected to last four years. On 28 January 2014, the construction was launched by the President of Uganda.

As of August 2017, the construction was 40 percent complete, according to the bridge contractors, as reported by The Observer (Uganda). During an inspection tour of the construction site by the Japanese ambassador to Uganda, the contractors revealed that they had started using steel from an unnamed Ugandan manufacturer, after the product met the contractors' standards.

Other infrastructure developments associated with the new bridge, include a “roadside station” or service centre on the Jinja side, which will host a restaurant, supermarket, public toilets, and an exhibition area. The station will also accommodate a chamber for bridge maintenance, security and an emergency response unit. The development also calls for surface roads on the Njeru side to connect to (a) the Nyenga-Njeru Road (b) the proposed Kampala–Jinja Expressway (c) the existing Kampala–Jinja Highway and the Mukono–Kayunga–Njeru Road. Road connections to the town of Jinja will be constructed, east of the road service centre.

The bridge was commissioned on 17 October 2018 by the President of Uganda Yoweri Kaguta Museveni to national acclaim. The president did caution though that the bridge is to be traversed by vehicular and pedestrian traffic only and is out of bounds to cyclists locally known as "bodabodas" which include bicycles and motorcycles which were advised to use the old Nalubale Bridge.

Construction costs
The total cost of the New Jinja Bridge was budgeted at US$125 million. The government of Japan will finance 80 percent of the cost, in the form of a soft loan of US$100 million at an annual interest rate of 0.01 percent, repayable in ten years but extendable to forty years. The government of Uganda will fund the remaining US$25 million (20 percent), out of its own coffers.

In March 2018, the Ugandan parliament authorized a supplementary loan from JICA, amounting to JPY:3.891 billion (UShs 133 billion or US$36.721), to complete this project. The bridge was completed and officially commissioned on 17 October 2018. The cost of construction was quoted at US$112 million (approximately USh41.1 billion) and has a projected lifespan of 120 years.

See also
List of roads in Uganda
New Karuma Bridge

Photos
 Photo Montage of New Nile Bridge at Google.com

References

External links
 Emirates bridges the gap for Uganda
 New Bridge Over River Nile Will Help Landlocked Uganda
 Names of Ugandan Projects Where Japan Is The Developmental Partner
 Overview of New Jinja Bridge
 New Nile bridge on course - UNRA

Bridges over the Nile
Bridges in Uganda
Bridges completed in 2018
Jinja District
Buikwe District
Cable-stayed bridges
2018 establishments in Uganda
Jinja, Uganda